The 1924 Washington and Lee Generals football team represented Washington and Lee University during the 1924 Southern Conference football season. The team claimed a title of the South Atlantic States.

Schedule

References

Washington and Lee
Washington and Lee Generals football seasons
Washington and Lee Generals football